Nurobod District is a district of Samarqand Region in Uzbekistan. The capital lies at the city Nurobod.

The district consists of one city (Nurobod), one urban-type settlement (Nurbuloq) and 7 rural communities (Jom, Jarquduq, Nurbuloq, Tim, Sazogʻon, Ulus, Tutli).

References 

Samarqand Region
Districts of Uzbekistan